Schwarzer Graben is a river of North Rhine-Westphalia, Germany.

The Schwarzer Graben springs south of Rietberg.

See also
List of rivers of North Rhine-Westphalia

References

Rivers of North Rhine-Westphalia
Rivers of Germany